New Beginnings  is a Kenyan soap opera  that made its debut on 9 October 2015. It takes love, envy, lust and deceit as the main thematic concerns. It stars Maya Hayakawa, Joed Kariuki, Neville Misati, Diana Nderitu and Habida Ebo.

Plot

New Beginnings is a drama about a love triangle between Julia, Derek and his best friend Sean. It delves into their lives and relationships. Sean wakes up from a five-year coma. His wife, Julia who had moved on with her life since she had lost hope of Sean's recovery, had married Sean's best friend Derek. As Sean is recovering his body strength, he meets Natasha, his nurse and they start a great friendship that later upgrades to love affair. This makes Julia who is still in love with Sean, is not able to do anything because she must keep appearances to her husband, Derek who turned abusive to her. Since the truth is right under everyone's nose, it will come out and it may cost the trust, good relationships and family ties that the characters had.

Series overview

Cast
Maya Hayakawa as Julie
Joed Kariuki as Derek 
Neville Misati as Sean 
Denise Gordon as Catherine
Diana Nderitu as Lexi
Habida Ebo as Natasha
Mugambi Nnega as Randy
Pete Openda as Alex
Divina Waweru as Tess
Amari Hayakawa as Jimmy
Randy Selwano as Dr. Kimani
Peter Oruka as Henchman
Douglas EbCole as Bruno
Julisa Rowe as Dr. Brown
Roly Ablah as Christian
Erastus Kimani as Dr. Lodwa
Melissa Kiplagat as Barbra
Peter Oruka as Henchman
Cyrus Kifuse as Jose
Nouhoum Kone as Sean

Broadcast
New Beginnings made its debut on Kenyan television at KTN on October 9, 2015 at 8:30 pm. It also premiered on Ebony Life TV, DSTV channel 165.

Awards and nominations

Notes

References

External links

2015 Kenyan television series debuts
English-language television shows
Kenyan television soap operas
2010s Kenyan television series
Kenya Television Network original programming